TBG AG, named for the Thyssen-Bornemisza Group, is a private investment firm based in Zurich, Switzerland.  The company is the investment arm of the Thyssen-Bornemisza family TBG's CEO is Christoph von Grolman.

Associated entities include TBG Holdings (Bermuda), Favorita Investment (Malta), Conscientia Investment (Malta), TBG Limited, and Urvanos Investments Limited.

Holdings and acquisitions
In April 2017 TBG acquired US-based weather and data analytics firm DTN, purchasing it from Schneider Electric for approximately $900M.

In September 2018 it acquired Netherlands-based weather company MeteoGroup for an undisclosed sum.

Subsidiary TBG Holdings purchased a majority stake in Italian valve maker Petrolvalves in 2015.

External links
TBG AG - Handelsregister, Zürich

References

Companies based in Zürich
Swiss companies established in 2014
Thyssen family
Venture capital firms